Diane Marie Jacobs (born 19 August 1943), known as Dinah Lee, is a New Zealand singer who performed 1960s pop and adult contemporary music. Her debut single from early 1964, "Don't You Know Yockomo?", achieved No. 1 chart success in New Zealand and in the Australian cities of Brisbane and Melbourne. It was followed in September by her cover version of Jackie Wilson's, "Reet Petite", which also reached No. 1 in New Zealand and peaked at No. 6 in Melbourne. The Australian release was a double A-sided single with "Do the Blue Beat". On her early singles she was backed by fellow New Zealanders, Max Merritt & His Meteors. Lee appeared regularly on both New Zealand and Australian TV variety programs, including Johnny O'Keefes Sing, Sing, Sing and Bandstand. She toured supporting Johnny O'Keefe, as well as Ray Columbus & the Invaders and P.J. Proby. According to Australian rock music journalist, Ed Nimmervoll, in the 1960s, "Lee was the most successful female singer in both her New Zealand homeland and Australia ... on stage and on record Dinah had all the adventure and exuberance for the time the boys had".

Early life
Dinah Lee was born as Diane Marie Jacobs on 19 August 1943 in Waimate, New Zealand. After her parents separated, she was fostered by a family near Christchurch where she attended Cashmere High School. Her father was a saxophonist, who worked selling carpets in a Christchurch department store and, part-time, ran a teen dance club – The Country Club Cabaret. In 1958, Lee was asked to sing at the club on Saturdays and became popular with local patrons. As a 15-year-old, she had her first professional gig with Bobby Davis & the Dazzlers in a small hall and they later worked in a coffee lounge. In 1962, Lee was working with Christchurch group, Saints, and dating their guitarist and vocalist, Phil Garland. By year's end Saints had split and Lee and Garland formed The Playboys with Mark Graham on guitar, Brian Ringrose (ex-Ray Columbus & the Invaders) on guitar, Dave Martin on guitar and Graeme Miller on drums. They relocated to Auckland for a residency at Top 20 Club, Lee shared lead vocals with Garland, one of her covers was Huey "Piano" Smith's "Don't You Know Yockomo?" popularised by American R&B artist Dee Dee Sharp. Playboys returned to Christchurch, but by 1963, Lee returned to Auckland to pursue her solo career, she supported gigs by Max Merritt & His Meteors or Ray Columbus & the Invaders. Playboys recruited Graeme's brother Dave on vocals and later became The Dave Miller Set in Sydney.

Lee adopted the latest Mod fashions following advice from boutique owner, Jackie Holme – a page boy haircut, white make-up, op-art clothes and white boots. After being recommended by Merritt, she joined the Startime Spectacular Tour of North Island which was headlined by Bill & Boyd and Max Merritt & His Meteors  – Merritt's band backed her during her set. Her performances were more animated and energetic than typically demure female pop artists. Lee was heckled at some regional venues and her mother was unable to recognise her when catching up at an airport. Tour organiser, James Haddleton, became her manager and she was signed with Viking Records, an independent label based in Wellington and she was promoted as 'Queen of the Mods'.

Career

1964-1965: New Zealand
Dinah Lee's debut single, "Don't You Know Yockomo?", was released in August 1964 – under the name Diane Lee, chosen by Viking – and peaked at No. 1 in New Zealand. Viking used Merritt's band to back her in the studio and after the first pressings had sold out, Viking changed the attribution to Dinah Lee. Ray Columbus & the Invaders' single, "She's a Mod" became the first by a New Zealand act to reach No. 1 on an Australian chart. Only weeks later, Lee's single, "Don't You Know Yockomo?" was issued there by EMI on their HMV label and reached No. 1 in Brisbane and Melbourne.

Lee's second single, "Reet Petite" was a cover of Jackie Wilson's hit and had also been recorded with Merritt's band, when released in September it reached No. 1 in New Zealand. Her third single, Ray Rivera's "Do the Blue Beat", followed in October in New Zealand. "Reet Petitie" and "Do the Blue Beat" were issued as a double A-sided single in Australia and reached No. 3 in Adelaide and No. 6 in Melbourne. Lee toured New Zealand and Australia on Starlift '64, promoted by Harry M. Miller, with a bill headed by The Searchers, Peter and Gordon and Del Shannon. Backing Lee at some gigs were Ray Columbus & the Invaders and, in Sydney, a newly formed group – The Easybeats. With "Reet Petite" charting in Australia, rock'n'roller Johnny O'Keefe invited Lee to appear on his television series, Sing, Sing, Sing and join his Sydney club shows.

Upon return to Auckland, Lee issued her fourth Viking single, "Who Stole the Sugar?" in November. She featured on two half-hour specials on New Zealand TV, while "I'm Walking" was issued as her next Australian single by HMV. By year's end, Viking had also released two extended plays, Don't You Know... and Yeah, Yeah We Love Them All and her debut album, Introducing Dinah Lee.

In early 1965, Lee appeared on Australian TV shows, Bandstand and Saturday Date. One of her Bandstand performances was at Myer Music Bowl with headlining Jamaican Blue beat singer Millie Small. Lee travelled to the United States to appear on Shindig! – she sang with Glen Campbell – and on other TV shows. Lee then went to the United Kingdom where she released, "I'll Forgive You Then Forget You" on Island Records' label Aladdin. In August–September, Lee toured New Zealand and Australia with US pop sensation, P.J. Proby – noted for splitting his pants on stage in the UK in February – who had been banned by the BBC. In Australia, HMV released "Let Me In" to coincide with the tour. Lee won 'Entertainer of the Year' at New Zealand's inaugural NEBOA Awards in late September – soon after she decided to base herself in Australia. Late in the year, Viking released a string of singles, "He Can't Do the Blue Beat", "Nitty Gritty" and "That's it I Quit", in New Zealand. In November, they released her second studio album, The Sound of Dinah Lee.

1966-1979: Australia
Late in 1965, Dinah Lee relocated to Sydney and in March 1966 she undertook a second tour with Small. Lee's next single was "He Don't Want Your Love Anymore" but her chart success had begun to decline. On 29 June 1966, Australian teen newspaper, Go-Set published "The Dinah Lee Story" and she appeared on their front cover. Her public popularity was still high – she was voted No. 2 'Female Vocal' in Go-Set'''s pop poll in October and was in the top 5 for 1967 and 1968. Lee continued to release singles in 1966, she toured with Proby in September–October and followed with a third studio album, The Mod World of Dinah Lee late that year. In April 1967, she became the 'face' for Yardley Cosmetics' commercials on Australian TV. Her July single for Viking and HMV was "Sorry Mama" but neither company renewed her contract.

Lee spent most of the late 1960s on the night club circuit with occasional variety TV appearances. Lee successfully sued her former manager, Haddleton, for money owed and re-took control of her financial interests. According to Australia rock music journalist, Ed Nimmervoll, in the 1960s, "Lee was the most successful female singer of in  both her New Zealand homeland and Australia ... on stage and on record Dinah had all the adventure and exuberance for the time the boys had." Lee entertained troops in Vietnam in the late 1960s on Australian Broadcasting Commission-sponsored tours (under her birth name, Diane Jacobs) and was awarded the Vietnam Logistic and Support Medal.

In the 1970s, she continued to release singles including "Tell Him" in 1972 on Polydor. In 1974, she joined O'Keefe on his comeback show, The Good Old Days of Rock'n'Roll, at St. George Leagues Club. Her next single, "It Doesn't Matter Anymore" appeared in 1976 on Festival Records. "I Can See Clearly Now" was released in 1979 on Laser Records.

1980s onwards
In 1982, a compilation, Best of Dinah Lee was issued on Music World. By 1984, she had become involved in body building winning the 'Australian Female Body Builder of the Year' in the over 35s category. In the 1990s and 2000s, Lee continued performing on the club circuit and became a motivational speaker.

ABC-TV series, Long Way to the Top, was broadcast in August 2001. Lee featured on "Episode 2: Ten Pound Rocker 1963–1968" where she discussed the mod look and her appeal to rebellious teens, "I had this image and it wasn't cute and pretty". The TV series inspired the Long Way to the Top national concert tour during August–September 2002, which featured a host of the best Australian acts of the 1950s, 1960s and 1970s. Lee's performances of "Yokomo"  and "Reet Petite" at the final Sydney concert, as well as an interview with promoter, Michael Chugg, feature on the associated DVD, Long Way to the Top: Live in Concert released in 2002.

Discography
Studio albums

Live albums

Compilation albums

Extended plays

Singles

Notes

A."Don't You Know Yockomo?" was originally released on Viking Records by Diane Lee in August 1964. After the first pressings sold out, Viking released it under the name, Dinah Lee, it was also released in Australia on EMI's label HMV. It appeared on the EP, Don't You Know... in September and subsequently appeared on her debut album, Introducing Dinah Lee later in the year. Four tracks, including "Don't You Know Yockomo?" and "Reet Petite" had been recorded in the studio with backing by Max Merritt & his Meteors. Merritt and his band were not credited on the first single but were credited on "Reet Petite" in September and on the four-track Don't You Know... EP. "Reet Petite" was not released in Australia until November when it appeared as a double A-sided single.
B."Do the Blue Beat" was originally released on Viking Records by Dinah Lee in September 1964. It was released in Australia on HMV, as a double-A-sided single with "Reet Petite" in November. It subsequently appeared on her debut album, Introducing Dinah Lee later in the year.

Awards and nominations
As from December 2010, Lee is a board member of Phonographic Performance Company of Australia. 

In October 2019 she was presented with the President's Award from the Variety Artists Club of New Zealand.
Aotearoa Music Awards
The Aotearoa Music Awards (previously known as New Zealand Music Awards (NZMA)) are an annual awards night celebrating excellence in New Zealand music and have been presented annually since 1965.

! 
|-
| 1965 || "Ill Forgive You Then Forget You" || Single of the Year||  || 
|-
| 2020 || Dinah Lee || New Zealand Music Hall of Fame ||  || 
|-

Go-Set Pop Poll
The Go-Set Pop Poll was coordinated by teen-oriented pop music newspaper, Go-Set and was established in February 1966 and conducted an annual poll during 1966 to 1972 of its readers to determine the most popular personalities.

|-
| 1966
| herself
| Female Vocal
| style="background:silver;"| 2nd
|-
| 1967
| herself
| Female Vocal
| 4th
|-
| 1968
| herself
| Female Vocal
| style="background:tan;"| 3rd
|-

Mo Awards
The Australian Entertainment Mo Awards (commonly known informally as the Mo Awards), were annual Australian entertainment industry awards. They recognise achievements in live entertainment in Australia from 1975 to 2016. Dinah Lee won one award in that time.
 (wins only)
|-
| 2009
| Dinah Lee
| John Campbell Fellowship Award 
| 
|-

RockoNZ

! 
|-
| 2007 || Dinah Lee || RockoNZ Rock Hall of Fame||  || 
|-

References

General

Specific

External links
Dinah Lee, RockoNZ biography for 2007 Rock Hall of Fame.
 Brief biography, Long Way to the Top'', Australian Broadcasting Corporation.
Dinah Lee photos held by Picture Australia, National Library of Australia.
Dinah Lee Papers and Dinah Lee Photographs at the Alexander Turnbull Library

1943 births
Living people
New Zealand pop musicians
People from Waimate
People educated at Cashmere High School
20th-century New Zealand  women singers
21st-century New Zealand  women singers